Henri Tebbitt (1852–1926) was an English-Australian painter.

Tebbit was born in Paris of English parents in 1852. He was self-taught as an artist and after travelling in various countries settled in England. An oil painting by him, "Wet Weather", was shown at the Royal Academy exhibition of 1884. Coming to Australia in 1889, he did a large amount of work, particularly in water-colour. His pictures for a time were very popular with the public, and examples were acquired for the Brisbane, Hobart, Launceston, Bendigo and Geelong galleries. He had married Martha Bateman in Scarborough in September 1877. They had a daughter Daisy Marguerite, born in Paris, France, in 1878. However, Henri immigrated to Australia without the family, and went on to marry Robertha McGuigan in Sydney in 1903.

He died in Rose Bay, Sydney, on 4 January 1926. Although his standing as an artist was not high, Tebbitt was a man of some character with a philosophic mind. Speaking of his own work in his manuscript autobiography at the Mitchell library, Sydney, he said: "I have simply endeavoured, perhaps with a vision obscured, to reproduce as faithfully as I could, nature as I see it, and if my efforts are indifferent, no one regrets it more than I do."
Henri was insistent that his name was to be pronounced "Hen-Rye".

References

 

1852 births
English watercolourists
Australian watercolourists
19th-century English painters
English male painters
20th-century English painters
Artists from Paris
Australian people of English descent
People educated at Cranbrook School, Kent
1926 deaths
20th-century English male artists
19th-century English male artists